Georges Bouriano/George Burianu was a Romanian racing car driver (20 August 1901, Brăila – 1996, Waterloo) who raced in the Bugatti T35C. He came second in the 1929 Monaco Grand Prix.  He was the last living participant in the race.

References

Romanian racing drivers
Grand Prix drivers
Sportspeople from Brăila